Grand Central Shopping Centre is a retail shopping centre in Toowoomba, Queensland, Australia. Owned by the Queensland Investment Corporation, it is the largest shopping centre in the Darling Downs, with the first stage opening in September 1996. A second stage opened in June 1999, and a third in 2017.

It features a Target, Coles, Birch, Carroll & Coyle five-screen cinema, a Kmart, Woolworths, Big W, Myer, Best & Less, and H&M and over 180 specialty stores over two levels. 
In November 2014, a $500 million redevelopment commenced that doubled the floor area to 90,000 m2 and the number of parking spaces to 4,000. It was completed in early 2017.

References

External links
Grand Central homepage

Buildings and structures in Toowoomba
Shopping centres in Queensland
Shopping malls established in 1996
1996 establishments in Australia